Montau is a mountain located in the municipal terms of Olesa de Bonesvalls (Alt Penedès) and Begues (Baix Llobregat), Catalonia, Spain. It has an elevation of 657 metres above sea level.

It is the highest point of the Garraf Massif, Catalan Coastal Range, although less conspicuous than La Morella, located closer to the coast. There is a triangulation station at the summit.

See also
Garraf Massif
Mountains of Catalonia

References

Mountains of Catalonia